Alon Confino is an Israeli cultural historian. He currently serves as the Director of the Institute for Holocaust, Genocide, and Memory Studies and a Professor of History and Judaic Studies at University of Massachusetts Amherst.

He grew up in Jerusalem, and studied at the University of Tel Aviv (BA) and University of California, Berkeley (MA & PHD).

Works

References

Cultural historians
Historians of the Holocaust
Israeli historians
Living people
Year of birth missing (living people)